Test Drive Unlimited (TDU) is an open world racing video game developed by Eden Games and published by Atari for Xbox 360 and Microsoft Windows. Atari Melbourne House developed the PlayStation 2 and PlayStation Portable versions. Being the eighteenth entry in the Test Drive series, Unlimited serves as a reboot of the franchise, discarding the continuity of the previous games.

It was soon followed by its sequel, Test Drive Unlimited 2 in 2011. A third game and soft reboot, Test Drive Unlimited Solar Crown, is currently under development (with KT Racing and Nacon replacing Eden Games and Atari, respectively), which will release in 2023.

Gameplay

In the online world of Test Drive Unlimited, players are able to drive both on-road and off-road in free-roam mode, challenging other players in real-time anywhere on the drivable map. It is also possible to drive on small islands outside of the main island. The Xbox 360 version has supported steering wheel controllers since launch. Following the third free update, Test Drive Unlimited supports force feedback wheel controllers such as Microsoft's Xbox 360 Wireless Racing Wheel.

The roads are modeled after satellite images of the island of Oahu. There is a spectrum of different terrains including rainforests, mountains, sandy beaches and urbanized areas (featuring the city of Honolulu). It is worth noting however, that other built-up areas on the island are not represented. Although advertising material for the game suggests it to be an exact depiction of the Hawaiian island, numerous government buildings (such as those on Pearl Harbor, Camp H. M. Smith, Hickam Air Force Base), commercial buildings (Ala Moana Center, the convention center, the entire commercial strip in Pearl City and the Pearlridge Center), and notable landmarks (statue of King Kamehameha I, USS Missouri, etc.) are not present in the game. Many roads and highways are also missing or placed far from their real-life counterparts. The ships docked in Pearl Harbor are also in very low detail and do not represent any active or retired USN vessel at all.

Single-player game
The game begins by purchasing a car and a house. The player is then free to explore the island; as this happens, key locations on the map are revealed. These include car and bike dealerships (motorcycles are not available in PlayStation 2 and PlayStation Portable versions), car rental agencies, tuning shops, paint shops, time challenges, courier, vehicle transportation, hitchhikers (not available in PlayStation 2 and PlayStation Portable versions) and more.

Success in challenges is rewarded with in-game money, or special coupons (earned by completing Hitchhiker and Top Model challenges). Using the coupons, the player can buy clothing for their character. The in-game money may be spent on buying new vehicles, renting cars, upgrading cars and buying houses. Players can acquire sports cars from various manufacturers, including Alfa Romeo, Aston Martin, Audi, Chevrolet, Ferrari, Ford, Jaguar, Lamborghini, Lexus, McLaren, Nissan, Pagani, Spyker, and many more. The megapack adds more than 45 more cars, including the Efijy Concept, the Ferrari 512 TR and the Nissan Skyline GT-R, and an extra motorcycle.

Missing content on Sony platforms
The PlayStation 2 and PlayStation Portable versions of Test Drive Unlimited are missing the following features:

Manual transmission (although transmission is visible in options, it is permanently set to automatic)
Avatar customization
Certain vehicles such as Ferrari, Maserati, Lexus, all motorcycles, and some models of different makers
All mission types (hitchhikers, top model, vehicle transporter etc.)
Cockpit view (PlayStation Portable)
NPCs in buildings (PlayStation Portable)
Rear-view and side mirrors are not functional (blurred out)
Some shops, like custom car paint
USB steering wheel support
Online Cruising (although functional in 2007, online infrastructure mode for both Sony platforms was shut down in 2009. PlayStation Portable's second available online option is ad hoc)
Secret Island Eden "E" Teleporter (but the island does exist on both platforms and can be driven on through the use of emulators and memory-editing software)
Content, visual and audio components were largely reduced due to hardware limitations.

Exclusive content on Sony platforms
 Master Points, a system where the player is awarded points for drifting, slipstreaming, airtime and generally driving around the island.
 Auto GPS, which automatically directs the player to the closest available race challenge.
 Car selection, as some cars that are only available in download packs for Xbox 360 and Windows are available from the start in the PlayStation 2 and PlayStation Portable versions.
 Radio stations in the PlayStation 2 and PlayStation Portable versions feature several exclusive instrumental tracks in addition to the licensed music.
 Quick Race, a mode that allows players to create a limitless number of races to compete in, with a random car.

Some of the exclusive features of the PlayStation 2 and PlayStation Portable versions were later implemented in Test Drive Unlimited 2.

Multiplayer game

The multiplayer component (branded as M.O.O.R. or Massively Open Online Racing) works as an extra layer on top of the single-player game: all activities available in single-player are also available in multiplayer. The following challenges are also available in multiplayer only:
 Race against other players
 Challenge players to complete tasks
 Attempt other player challenges

Racing against other players works in freeride by using a custom geolocalized matchmaking system, added using Xbox Live Server Platform (XLSP). Multiplayer races spots are handled by using the player match/ranked match system employed by Xbox Live. The Microsoft Windows version uses the GameSpy network for authentication.

It is also possible to create an immediate, ad hoc race against another player by flashing headlights at their vehicle.

Players may create and join "clubs" which help organize player events. Vehicles may be traded between players through a central "clearing house"-style interface that lists the vehicles for sale along with class, mileage, specification, and price information.

It is also possible to play online with the addition of a network adapter to a PlayStation 2 and via Infrastructure Mode on the PlayStation Portable.

The server structure consisted of 11 individual machines working in a distributed, scalable way.

The Xbox 360 and Microsoft Windows servers were shut down on 29 September 2012. The PlayStation 2 and PlayStation Portable servers were shut down on an earlier date.

On 28 September 2014, community members launched a private server for the Microsoft Windows version of the game.

Downloadable content

Xbox 360
On the Xbox 360, new cars could be downloaded via Xbox Live, similar to Project Gotham Racing 3 and 4s Booster Packs and Midnight Club: Los Angeless South Central vehicle packs. Some individual cars were available to download for free, while others were paid purchases as part of a pack. All downloaded cars still need to be purchased with in-game money at their respective dealerships before they can be used in the game. There were eight car packs and eight free cars.

There is also a downloadable mode called "hardcore mode" which makes the game experience more realistic. It was designed for players with an Xbox 360 Racing Wheel controller. The hardcore mode is free however in the Windows version, and can be unlocked by achieving a higher specific rank.

All DLC for Xbox 360 have since been removed.

Microsoft Windows
There has been one patch for the Windows version of Test Drive Unlimited. As part of this patch, the Nissan Skyline GTR R34 and Audi RS4 quattro Saloon (B7) cars were released for free. Windows Vista users who have the 32-bit platform installed will have fewer issues with freezing during saving points. The 64-bit platform invariably creates conflicts despite the 4GB system memory that most users have (as recommended by the Atari manufacturer of TDU), as the game tends to draw from the user's RAM as opposed to dedicated video card memory. Moreover, there is a 'Megapack' DLC which Windows users can purchase, featuring 45 cars, one bike and some fixes. These include the limited edition "exclusive" cars available for the Xbox 360 version as well as the contents of the first five DLC packs previously released over Xbox Live. It is, however, incompatible with localized versions, but it is released in Russia as an add-on and also it is included in a TDU Gold Edition.

Special NPCs in PlayStation 2 version
There were 1500 total beta testers in Atari's closed beta for Test Drive Unlimited for PlayStation 2. At the end of the testing period, Atari awarded 30 of the most active testers with "immortality" in the PlayStation 2 version of Test Drive Unlimited. These 30 beta testers were allowed to name one of the non-playable characters (NPC) in the game. Some chose to use their first and last name; others chose to use their screen names. These 30 special NPCs can be found spread throughout the virtual island of only the PlayStation 2 version. Atari and Melbourne House ensured the Beta Testers were given prominent positions as NPCs. Among the play testers were also friends and family of staff at Melbourne House, including staff members themselves, who are included within the different motoring clubs featured within the game. Most were granted President or Vice President status in the car clubs and were put in highly desirable performance cars.

Platinum
A community of game modders have created a "Platinum Edition" mod with over 880 cars, physic tweaks, HDR weather, and various updates. This is for PC only and can be downloaded for free. *Reference needed.

Reception

Test Drive Unlimited received "generally favorable" reviews, according to review aggregator Metacritic.

411Mania gave the Xbox 360 version a score of 8.6 out of 10 and stated: "Even if you own a next-gen racing game, this is a title that you MUST try out. This is such an open ended game that never actually ends ala  World of Warcraft and feeling like you're a part of the Island with your homes, vehicles and club is too much of a cool thing to pass up." The Sydney Morning Herald gave the same version a score of four stars out of five and called it "a car aficionado's paradise and a novel concept in driving games. Unlimiteds online world is certain to be mimicked." The Times also gave it four stars out of five and claimed that it "comes closer than most games to re-creating the freedom of real life." In Japan, where the Xbox 360 version was ported and published by Microsoft on 26 April 2007, both Famitsu and Famitsu Xbox 360 gave it a score of 34 out of 40.

References

External links

2006 video games
Atari games
Open-world video games
PlayStation 2 games
PlayStation Portable games
Racing video games
Unlimited
Video games developed in Australia
Video games developed in France
Video games featuring protagonists of selectable gender
Video games set in Hawaii
Video games with alternative versions
Windows games
Xbox 360 games
Video games using Havok
Multiplayer and single-player video games
Eden Games games